The Roman Catholic Diocese of Shendam (Latin:Dioecesis Shendamensis) a diocese located in the city of Shendam, Plateau State in the Ecclesiastical province of Jos in Nigeria. The Diocese was established on Jos June 2, 2007.

The Cathedral is Cathedral of the Sacred Heart of Jesus in Shendam. Shendam was the first Roman Catholic Mission foundation north of the rivers Niger and Benue in Nigeria.  Three members of the Society of African Missions: Oswald Waller, Joseph Mouren and Ernest Belin, arrived at Shendam on 12 February 1907 after spending 28 days in canoes on the river Benue.

Bishops 
Bishop James Naanman Daman, O.S.A. (June 2, 2007 – January 12, 2015)
Bishop Philip Davou Dung (November 5, 2016 -)

Other priest of this diocese who became bishop
Oliver Dashe Doeme, appointed Bishop of Maiduguri in 2009

See also 
 Roman Catholicism in Nigeria

Sources 
 GCatholic.org Information
 Catholic Hierarchy

Roman Catholic dioceses in Nigeria
Christian organizations established in 2007
Roman Catholic dioceses and prelatures established in the 21st century
Roman Catholic Ecclesiastical Province of Jos